A Rayl, rayl or Rayleigh is one of two units of specific acoustic impedance or, equivalently, characteristic acoustic impedance; one an MKS unit, and the other a CGS unit. These have the same dimensions as momentum per volume.

The units are named after John William Strutt, 3rd Baron Rayleigh. They are not to be confused with the rayleigh unit of photon flux, which is used to measure airglow and is named after his son, Robert John Strutt, 4th Baron Rayleigh.

Explanation

Specific acoustic impedance
When sound waves pass through any physical substance the pressure of the waves causes the particles of the substance to move. The sound specific impedance is the ratio between the sound pressure and the particle velocity it produces.

Specific acoustic impedance is defined as: 

Characteristic acoustic impedance
The Rayl is also used for the characteristic (acoustic) impedance of a medium, which is an inherent property of a medium: 

In a viscous medium, there will be a phase difference between the pressure and velocity, so the specific acoustic impedance  will be different from the characteristic acoustic impedance .

MKS and CGS units
The MKS unit and the CGS unit confusingly have the same name, but not the same value:

 In MKS units, 1 Rayl equals 1 pascal-second per meter (Pa·s·m−1), or equivalently 1 newton-second per cubic meter (N·s·m−3). In SI base units, that is kg·s−1·m−2.

 In CGS units, 1 Rayl equals 1 barye-second per centimeter (ba·s·cm−1), or equivalently 1 dyne-second per cubic centimeter (dyn·s·cm−3). In CGS base units, that is g·s−1·cm−2.

1 CGS Rayl = 10 MKS Rayl. In other words, a CGS Rayl is ten times larger than an MKS Rayl.

References

T. D. Rossing, Springer Handbook of Acoustics, Springer, 2007, p. 60

L. E. Kinsler, A. R. Frey, A. B. Coppens, and J. V. Sanders, Fundamentals of Acoustics, Fourth Edition (New York: John Wiley & Sons, Inc.,2000), p. 126

External links 
Dictionary of Physics Units of Measurement
A discussion of the history and ambiguity of the rayl

Units of measurement
Non-SI metric units